The Oconee River Greenway is a trail along the Oconee River in Milledgeville, Georgia. It opened in 2008. It includes fishing areas, paved trails for bicycles and foot traffic, and a boat ramp. River flow can change rapidly due to operations of a Georgia Power plant upstream of the Greenway. Recent trail expansion connects the Greenway to Flagg Chapel and Memory Hill Cemetery.

References

External links
Oconee River Greenway Map from Alltrails

Greenways
Milledgeville, Georgia
2008 establishments in Georgia (U.S. state)
Buildings and structures in Baldwin County, Georgia
Bike paths in Georgia (U.S. state)
Transportation in Baldwin County, Georgia